These are the results for the boys' singles event at the 2018 Summer Youth Olympics.

Seeds

Results

Group stage

Group A

Group B

Group C

Group D

Group E

Group F

Group G

Group H

Knockout stage

References 

 Schedule

External links
 Group Play Summary 
 Draw 

Badminton at the 2018 Summer Youth Olympics